Koníček means 'small horse' or 'hobby' in Czech. It is also a Czech surname that may refer to: 
Karel Koníček, Czechoslovak slalom canoeist
Libor Koníček (born 1995), Slovak football goalkeeper 
Miroslav Koníček (born 1936), Czech rower 
Štěpán Koníček (1928–2006), Czech composer and conductor 

Czech-language surnames